Iambe (Ancient Greek: Ἰάμβη means 'banter'), in Greek mythology, was a Thracian woman, daughter of Pan and Echo, granddaughter of Hermes, and a servant of Metaneira, the wife of Hippothoon. Others call her a slave of Celeus, king of Eleusis.

Mythology 
The extravagant hilarity displayed at the festivals of Demeter in Attica was traced to her, for it is said that when Demeter, in her wanderings in search of her daughter, arrived in Attica, Iambe cheered the mournful goddess with her jokes.Till Iambe, who was knowing and careful, placed for herA fixed seat, and draped a bright-shining fleece over it.There she sat down, and held a veil in front of her.For a long time she sat on the couch without speaking, sorrowing,Nor did she embrace anyone in word or deed,But without laughing and not tasting food or drinkShe sat wasting away in longing for her deep-girdled daughter,Till Iambe, who was knowing and careful, with jestsMade many jokes and turned the mood of the divine lady,By smiling and laughing, and keeping her heart gracious:So she pleased the goddess afterwards with her kindly temperament.Iambe was believed to have given the name to iambic poetry, for some said that she hanged herself in consequence of the cutting speeches in which she had indulged, and others that she had cheered Demeter by a dance in the Iambic metre.

See also
Baubo
The Lay of Narcissus

Notes

References
Apollodorus, The Library with an English Translation by Sir James George Frazer, F.B.A., F.R.S. in 2 Volumes, Cambridge, MA, Harvard University Press; London, William Heinemann Ltd. 1921. . Online version at the Perseus Digital Library. Greek text available from the same website.
Diodorus Siculus, The Library of History translated by Charles Henry Oldfather. Twelve volumes. Loeb Classical Library. Cambridge, Massachusetts: Harvard University Press; London: William Heinemann, Ltd. 1989. Vol. 3. Books 4.59–8. Online version at Bill Thayer's Web Site
Diodorus Siculus, Bibliotheca Historica. Vol 1-2. Immanel Bekker. Ludwig Dindorf. Friedrich Vogel. in aedibus B. G. Teubneri. Leipzig. 1888–1890. Greek text available at the Perseus Digital Library.
The Homeric Hymns and Homerica with an English Translation by Hugh G. Evelyn-White. Homeric Hymns. Cambridge, MA.,Harvard University Press; London, William Heinemann Ltd. 1914. Online version at the Perseus Digital Library. Greek text available from the same website.

Mythological Thracian women
Eleusinian Mysteries
Eleusinian mythology
Deeds of Demeter

fr:Ïambe